Vinquoy chambered cairn is a Neolithic chambered cairn located on the island of Eday, in Orkney, Scotland. The tomb probably dates to the early third millennium BC, and is similar in design to Maeshowe Neolithic tomb found on Mainland Orkney. Historic Environment Scotland established the site as a scheduled monument in 1936.

Description
Vinquoy chambered cairn is a restored Maeshowe-type Neolithic tomb on the island of Eday in Orkney, Scotland. The monument was built on the highest point in the island, on Vinquoy Hill on the North side of Eday, overlooking Calf Sound. It has a  entrance passage leading to a central chamber with four small side-cells. The chambered cairn is partly below ground, carved into the hill. The central chamber originally had a corbelled roof. The site is open to the public  and is part of the Eday Heritage Trail.

History
The tomb was first excavated in 1857 by antiquarian James Farrer and landowner Robert Fraser Hebden, who dug into the chamber through the top of the mound. According to the 1878 journal of the Society of Antiquarians of Scotland, Hebden, who bought his Eday estate in 1850,  "made considerable antiquarian researches over the island from time to time at his own expense; but although the property abounds in ancient tumuli, nothing of interest was discovered beyond a few flint flakes, some human skulls, and a sculptured stone which he presented to the Museum".

The tomb most likely dates to the early third millennium BC, because of its similar design to Maeshowe Neolithic chambered tomb on Mainland Orkney, which dates to 2800 BC. Vinquoy chambered cairn was originally scheduled by Historic Scotland in 1936.

References

1857 archaeological discoveries
Archaeological sites in Orkney
Prehistoric Orkney
Scheduled monuments in Scotland
Chambered cairns in Scotland
3rd-millennium BC architecture in Scotland